Robert Więckiewicz (born 30 June 1967) is a Polish film and television actor from Nowa Ruda, Poland. In 2013, he received Best Actor Award at the Chicago International Film Festival for his role in film Walesa: Man of Hope.

Selected filmography

Discography

References

External links

1967 births
Living people
Polish male stage actors
Polish male film actors
Polish male voice actors
People from Nowa Ruda
Recipients of the Order of Polonia Restituta